Ian Douglas Graham (born 14 March 1969) is a former English cricketer.  Graham was a right-handed batsman who bowled right-arm fast-medium.  He was born in Akrotiri, Cyprus.

Graham made his debut for Suffolk in the 1989 Minor Counties Championship against Cumberland.  Graham played Minor counties cricket for Suffolk from 1989 to 2001, which included 62 Minor Counties Championship appearances and 23 MCCA Knockout Trophy matches.  He made his List A debut against Worcestershire in the 1990 NatWest Trophy.  He made 10 further List A appearances, the last of which came against Herefordshire in the 2nd round of the 2001 Cheltenham & Gloucester Trophy, which was played in 2001.  In his 11 List A matches, he scored 122 runs at an average of 11.09, with a high score of 48.  With the ball, he took 18 wickets at a bowling average of 22.05, with best figures of 4/17.

His brother, Colin, also played List A and Minor counties cricket for Suffolk.

References.

External links
Ian Graham at ESPNcricinfo
Ian Graham at CricketArchive

1968 births
Living people
English cricketers
Suffolk cricketers